The Monti Prenestini is a mountain range in the Lazio sub-Apennines, in central Italy to the east of Rome. It is of limestone formation.  It is bounded by the Monti Tiburtini to the north, by the Monti Ruffi to the east, and by the valley of the river Sacco to the south. The highest peak is Monte Guadagnolo (1,218 m), in the comune of Capranica Prenestina.

External links
Description page 

Mountains of Lazio
Mountain ranges of the Apennines